ASC Ouragahio is an Ivorian football club. They play their home games at 6,000 capacity Stade de Yamoussoukro.

Ouragahio
Ouragahio
Sport in Yamoussoukro